Timothy F. Hayes (1946 – 6 April 2021) was an Irish Gaelic footballer who played for club side Clonakilty, at inter-county level with the Cork senior football team and with Munster. His Hurling Club was Ballinhassig where he won many honours. He lined out on both attack and defence.

Career

Hayes first played competitive Gaelic football during his schooling at St. Mary's College, something which resulted in him being selected for the Cork minor team as a 16-year-old in 1962. It was the first of three years with the team, culminating with an All-Ireland minor final appearance in 1964. Hayes was still a minor when he was drafted onto the under-21 team, and he won two Munster Under-21 Championship titles. He joined his brother Flor Hayes on the Cork senior team in 1966 and won a Munster Championship title as a panel member in his debut year. Hayes made a number of championship appearances before his last game in 1970. Hayes also earned selection on the Munster team and made a county final appearance with Clonakilty in 1968.

With Ballinhassig he won a Junior titles in 1973 with runners-up on 1 occasion and a 2 intermediate titles in 1975, 1977 (captain).

Honours

Cork
Munster Senior Football Championship: 1966
Munster Under-21 Football Championship: 1963, 1965
Munster Minor Football Championship: 1964

References

1946 births
2021 deaths
Clonakilty Gaelic footballers
Clonakilty hurlers
Ballinhassig hurlers
Cork inter-county Gaelic footballers
Munster inter-provincial Gaelic footballers